Inagta Rinconada (Mount Iriga Agta) is a Bikol language spoken by a semi-nomadic hunter-gatherer Agta (Negrito) people of the Philippines. It is spoken to the east of Iriga City up to the shores of Lake Buhi. The language is largely intelligible with Mount Iraya Agta on the other side of the lake.

The Rinconada Agta live primarily in forests near rural barangays of Buhi, Iriga (including a settlement in the Ilian area), and Baao in Camarines Sur (Lobel 2013:68).

Locations
Reid (1994) also reports a closely related variety called Rugnot spoken in the area of Lake Buhi, Camarines Sur. Inagta locations listed by Reid (1994) are as follows.
Santa Niño, Hayagan, and Santa Cruz, Ipil, Buhi, Camarines Sur
San Augustine, Buhi, Camarines Sur; SIL
San Ramon, Lake Buhi, Camarines Sur; SIL

References

Bikol languages
Languages of Camarines Sur